is a Japanese news magazine show broadcast every weekday on Fuji TV from 4:55 a.m. to 8:00 a.m. Mezamashi is a form of the Japanese verb mezamasu (to wake up).

History 
In the first half of the 1990s, several news magazine shows of Fuji TV in the morning were discontinued after a short period because of low television ratings. The new show featured two presenters, Norikazu Otsuka and Akiko Yagi. Otsuka was a freelance presenter who had been a presenter at NHK. Mezamashi TV was first broadcast on April 1, 1994.

In 1997, Natsuko Kojima was appointed as an additional main newscaster. In 2003, Aya Takashima was appointed as a new main newscaster.

Main parts

Kyo no Uranai CountDown! 
 is a fortune-telling segment. This segment has continued since the beginning of Mezamashi TV.

Kyo no Wanko 
 is a segment that shows interesting dogs in Japan. This segment has been continuing since 1994. This part is narrated by Kikue Nishiyama.

Main presenters
 Norikazu Otsuka (April 1994 – November 2011)
 Toshihiro Ito (November 2011 – March 2012)
 Masaharu Miyake (April 2012 – present)
 Yūmi Nagashima
 Yōko Ozawa　(September 2015 – September 2016)
 Shinichi Karube

References

External links
  

Japanese television news shows
1990s Japanese television series
2000s Japanese television series
2010s Japanese television series
1994 Japanese television series debuts
Fuji TV original programming